Lake Beseck, also known as Beseck Lake, is a body of water in Middlefield, Connecticut, measuring a little less than 1 mile in length and a quarter mile in width. It is owned by the Department of Environmental Protection and was created in 1846 when it was dammed. The initial dam, finished in 1848, was ten feet lower than the current one. The dam was raised in 1852 and in 1870, each time by five feet; it was rebuilt in 1938.

External links 
 Connecticut Government site on Lake Beseck
 Atkins, History of Middlefield and Long Hill (1883)

Middlefield, Connecticut
Beseck
Beseck
Protected areas of Middlesex County, Connecticut